The St. Michael the Archangel Cathedral It is a Catholic temple in Tegucigalpa, Honduras. Its well known ofr being the biggst catholic tmeple during the colonial times aun one of the most well preseved historical buildings in Honduras.

History 

In 1746, a fire consumed the temple dedicated to the town of Tegucigalpa named as Iglesia de La Limpia de la Inmaculada Concepción who was the church of the central park of Tegucigalpa. It is when the Bishop of Honduras Diego Rodriguez de Rivas y Velasco, at that time apostolic hierarch in the city of Comayagua, in 1756 ordered the construction of a new temple on the same site, charging that objective the priest Jose Simeon Zelaya Cepeda.

The parish of St. Michael the Archangel was founded in 1763, while the cathedral began to be built between 1765-1786 by Father Jose Simeon Zelaya Cepeda, who had studied in the Tridentine College of Comayagua, the architect was Joseph Gregory Nazianzen Quiroz, of Guatemalan origin; the work was consecrated and inaugurated by Fray Antonio de San Miguel in 1782. In 1858 after the mayor's office of Tegucigalpa decided to demolish the remains of the old church that was now in the let side of the cathedral. The only evidence of its existence are archives belonging to the Tegucigalpa diocese and a lithograph from 1857 showing the Tegucigalpa plaza and said church on the left side, after its demolition the wasteland was used to build new buildings.The cathedral would survive the Honduran civil wars of 1919 and 1924, where various buildings in Tegucigalpa would be damaged by bullets, however the temple managed to survive this tragedy. Between 1934 and 1938, a long process of restoration of the building began, seeking to preserve the artistic works inside. Being in 1934, the Honduran painter Teresa Victoria Fortín Franco the person who worked together with the teacher Alejandro del Vecchio in the decoration and restoration of some works of the cathedral church of Tegucigalpa. 

Over the decades, archaeological excavations began inside the temple to understand the techniques of its constructiond unring the 18th century. In recent years, its original salmon color was restored, and the latest restoration work was a remodeling of its interior as well as its side patios.

Architecture 

The building is about 60 meters long, 11 wide and 18 high, it has a single vaulted body and its dome reaches 30 meters high. The style of the architecture is Baroque. In 1788 the religious painter José Miguel Gómez also graduated from the Tridentino College of Saint Agustin of Comayagua finished the painting work in the Cathedral, his works being the following: "Holy Family", "Holy Trinity", "Saint John of Colazan" and "the Holy Supper ”The“ Four Evangelists ”were painted adorning the vault. These works were carried out by agreement with Bishop Fray Diego Rodrigo de Rivas, in the "rockery" style is the Main Altarpiece and the silver front of the main altar without forgetting the beautiful sculpture of San Miguel, in the back of the cathedral there is a courtyard with an altar in honor of the Virgin of Lourdes.

An earthquake in 1823 caused severe damage in the cathedral, which is why it was closed for repair for six years. In 1934, the Honduran painter Teresa Victoria Fortín Franco, worked together with the teacher Alejandro del Vecchio in the decoration and restoration of some works of the Cathedral Church of Tegucigalpa.

The Cathedral of San Miguel de Tegucigalpa is one of the oldest and most important buildings in the city that is preserved to this day in good general condition. The building has a place in Honduran history that is not limited to the sphere of influence of the city of Tegucigalpa but to the entire country, being the most renowned and traditional church since the beginning of the 20th century.

Being an old building, a proposal was made to restore the interior, the atrium, the side courtyards and the façade: the project has been carried out by the Department of Anthropological Research through the Archeology Section of the Honduran Institute of Anthropology and History.

Historical figures buried in the cathedral 
Some figures of historical relevance that are buried in the cathedral are:

 Presbyter José Simón Zelaya Cepeda, builder of the cathedral.
 Priest José Trinidad Reyes, founder of the Honduran National University.
 General José Santos Guardiola, President of the State of Honduras.
 General Manuel Bonilla, President of the Republic of Honduras.
 Bishop José María Martínez y Cabañas, first hierarch of the Archdiocese of Tegucigalpa

National Monument 
The cathedral was declared a National Monument according to Legislative Decree No. 8 issued in July 1967, according to the petition made before the Chamber of Deputies by the then Archbishop of Honduras, Monsignor Héctor Enrique Santos Hernández

See also
Roman Catholicism in Honduras
St. Michael's Church
Immaculate Conception Cathedral, Comayagua

References

Roman Catholic cathedrals in Honduras
Buildings and structures in Tegucigalpa
Roman Catholic churches completed in 1786
1786 establishments in New Spain
18th-century Roman Catholic church buildings in Honduras